José Antônio Martins Galvão (born July 8, 1982), also known simply as Galvão, is a Brazilian former professional footballer who played as a striker. He played in the top division in Brazil, Switzerland and Japan.

Club statistics

Honours
São Paulo State League: 2006
Brazilian League (2nd division): 2006
Minas Gerais State League: 2007

External links

 sambafoot
 CBF
 zerozero.pt
 placar
 Guardian Stats Centre

1982 births
Living people
Association football forwards
Brazilian footballers
Brazilian expatriate footballers
Campeonato Brasileiro Série A players
Campeonato Brasileiro Série B players
Swiss Super League players
J1 League players
J2 League players
Clube Atlético Mineiro players
Servette FC players
Paraná Clube players
Iraty Sport Club players
Sanfrecce Hiroshima players
Ventforet Kofu players
Santos FC players
Associação Portuguesa de Desportos players
Associação Desportiva São Caetano players
Vila Nova Futebol Clube players
Duque de Caxias Futebol Clube players
União São João Esporte Clube players
Expatriate footballers in Switzerland
Expatriate footballers in Japan
People from Lins, São Paulo